Maupiti is a commune of French Polynesia, an overseas territory of France in the Pacific Ocean. The commune is in the administrative subdivision of the Leeward Islands.

The commune of Maupiti is made up of the island of Maupiti proper with its surrounding islets emerging from the coral reef, with an area of 12.1 km2 in total, and of three distant atolls:
Maupihaa ( Mopelia), 4.6 km2 in land area, located 185 km (115 mi) south-west of Maupiti
Manuae (a.k.a. Scilly), 4.9 km2 in land area, located 255 km (160 mi) west of Maupiti. This atoll is the westernmost emerged land of French Polynesia.
Motu One (a.k.a. Bellinghausen), 3.97 km2 (0.9 sq mi) in land area, located 250 km (155 mi) north-west of Maupiti.

Most of the inhabitants live on Maupiti island itself. The atolls of Maupihaa and Manuae have 20 and 21 inhabitants respectively, while Motu One is uninhabited. At the 2017 census the commune had a population of 1,286.

The administrative center of the commune is the settlement of Vaiea, on the island of Maupiti.

References

Communes of French Polynesia